is a private hospital located in the Gotanda district of Shinagawa, Tokyo, Japan. It was founded as Kanto Teishin Hospital for employees of NTT Public Corporation in 1952, and was opened to general public in 1986. The present hospital building was renovated in 2000. It was accredited by Joint Commission International in 2011.

External links
 

Hospital buildings completed in 1952
Hospitals in Tokyo